The 2016 AFF U-19 Youth Championship was an international football tournament that was held in Vietnam from 11 September to 24 September. The 10 national teams involved in the tournament were required to register a squad of 23 players; only players in these squads are eligible to take part in the tournament. Ages are as of the first day of the tournament, 11 September 2016.

Group A

Malaysia
Head Coach :  Frank Bernhardt

Philippines
Head Coach: Dan Sionosa Padernal

Singapore
Head Coach: Richard Tardy

Timor Leste
Head Coach:  Shigeo Yamazaki

Vietnam
Head Coach:Hoang Anh Tuan

Group B

Australia
Head Coach: Ufuk Talay

The following 23 players were selected: Caps and goals correct as of 7 October 2015.

Cambodia
The following 23 players were called up for the Cambodia Squad

Head Coach:  Kazunori Ohara

Indonesia
The following 23 players were called up for the Indonesia squad.

Head Coach:Eduard Tjong

Laos
Head coach: Phunthawat Suppavasantichon

Myanmar 
The following 23 players were called up for the Myanmar Squad.

Head coach:Myo Hlaing Win

The following 23 players were called up for the Thailand squad.

Head Coach:Anurak Srikerd

References

AFF U-19 Youth Championship
Association football tournament squads